General elections were held in Western Samoa on 25 February 1967. All candidates ran as independents and voting was restricted to Matai and citizens of European origin ("individual voters"), with the Matai electing 45 MPs and Europeans two. Following the election, Fiame Mata'afa Faumuina Mulinu'u II remained Prime Minister.

Campaign
A total of 126 candidates contested the 45 Samoan seats, with five running in the individual voter seats.

Although voting was restricted to matais, the ability of traditional chiefs to create new matai led to significant changes in voter demographics in some areas, with the number of matais more than doubling since 1961. In Vaisigano No. 1 constituency, the number of matais increased from 139 in 1965 to over 1,400 by the 1967 elections. Trucks had been sent out to collect people and register them as matai, including many women, who were traditionally rarely made matai.

Results
Sixteen MLAs lost their seats, including Minister of Education Papali'i Poumau. Surprising defeats included Afoafouvale Misimoa in Palauli East and Tufuga Efi in Vaisigano No. 1.

Aftermath
Following the elections, members of the Legislative Assembly elected Magele Ate as Speaker and Tuala Paulo as Deputy Speaker. Fiame Mata'afa was re-elected as Prime Minister, and formed an eight-member cabinet on 17 March, including three new ministers, Luamanuvae Eti, Lesatele Rapi and Tuaopepe Tame.

See also
List of members of the Legislative Assembly of Western Samoa (1967–1970)

References

External links
Samoan election results by constituency 1964–2016 Samoa Election Results Database

Western Samoa
General
Elections in Samoa
Non-partisan elections
Western Samoa
Election and referendum articles with incomplete results